Brieštie ( or ; , until 1889 ) is a village and municipality in Turčianske Teplice District in the Žilina Region of northern central Slovakia. A former german village of Hadviga is now part of the village.

History
In historical records the village was first mentioned in 1392.

Geography
The municipality lies at an altitude of 580 metres and covers an area of 11.175 km². It has a population of about 159 people.

Genealogical resources

The records for genealogical research are available at the state archive "Statny Archiv in Bytca, Slovakia"

 Roman Catholic church records (births/marriages/deaths): 1730-1897 (parish B)
 Lutheran church records (births/marriages/deaths): 1784-1896 (parish B)

See also
 List of municipalities and towns in Slovakia

References

External links
Surnames of living people in Briestie

Villages and municipalities in Turčianske Teplice District